Grabów nad Prosną  is a town in Ostrzeszów County, Greater Poland Voivodeship, Poland, with about 1,900 inhabitants.

Notable persons
 Teofil Ciesielski (1847-1916), botanist and beekeeper, professor of botany at the University of Lviv, director of the botanical garden in Lviv, one of the initiators and founders of Polish Copernicus Society of Naturalists
 Władysław Biegański (1857-1917), medical doctor, philosopher and social activist

Cities and towns in Greater Poland Voivodeship
Ostrzeszów County
Sieradz Voivodeship (1339–1793)
Poznań Voivodeship (1921–1939)